Ronald Glen Miles (May 9, 1963 – March 8, 2022) was an American jazz trumpeter, cornetist, and composer.  He recorded for the labels Prolific (1986), Capri (1990), and Gramavision.  His final album, Rainbow Sign, was his first on the Blue Note label.

Early life
Miles was born in Indianapolis, Indiana, on May 9, 1963.  His parents, Fay Downey Miles and Jane Miles worked for the federal civil service.  The family relocated to Denver, Colorado, when he was eleven, partly because his parents thought the mountain climate would be better for his asthma.  He began learning the trumpet during this time at a summer music program.  He attended Denver East High School, where he played in its jazz combo together with Don Cheadle.  After graduating, Miles initially studied electrical engineering at the University of Denver.  However, he eventually switched his major to music and transferred to the University of Colorado Boulder, where he first met Fred Hess.  Miles won a classical competition at the International Brass Clinic hosted by Indiana University Bloomington.  This enabled him to earn a scholarship to the Manhattan School of Music in New York City, where he obtained a master's degree.

Career
Miles's debut album, Distance for Safety, was released in 1987.  Two years later, he distributed his second album titled Witness.  He toured with the Mercer Ellington Orchestra during this time and went to Italy with Sophisticated Ladies in 1992.  He also received national recognition playing with the Duke Ellington Orchestra, Ginger Baker, and the Bill Frisell Quartet.  His third album, My Cruel Heart (1996), saw him delve into his unique flair of modern creative jazz combined with rock influences.  He also collaborated with Bill Frisell that year on the latter's album Quartet.  The two teamed up again the following year on Miles's album Woman's Day, which was influenced by grunge and post-rock.

Miles recorded a total of twelve solo albums throughout his 35-year career.  His final album, Rainbow Sign, was released in 2020 and was his first with Blue Note Records.  He wrote the album as a tribute to his father, who died in 2018, and recorded it with Frisell (guitar), Jason Moran (piano), Thomas Morgan (bass), and Brian Blade (drums).  The quintet – which started performing together in 2016 – later became the first ensemble to play in front of an audience at the Village Vanguard after 18 months of lockdown during the COVID-19 pandemic.  Miles became one of Denver's most prominent jazz musicians, but only started receiving national acclaim towards the end of his career.  Bret Saunders, a jazz columnist for The Denver Post and a friend of Miles, surmised that he could have had a more renowned career had he not decided to remain in Denver.  Miles joined the Metropolitan State University of Denver during the late 1990s.  He taught there as a professor of music, and eventually became director of its Jazz Studies program.

Personal life
Miles was married to Kari until his death.  Together, they had two children: Justice and Honor.

Miles died on the evening of March 8, 2022, at his home in Denver.  He was 58, and suffered from polycythemia vera — a rare blood cancer — prior to his death.

Discography

As leader 
 Distance for Safety (Prolific, 1987)
 Witness (Capri, 1989)
 My Cruel Heart (Gramavision, 1996)
 Women's Day (Gramavision, 1997)
 Ron Miles Trio (Capri, 2000)
 Heaven (Sterling Circle, 2002) – recorded in 2001
 Laughing Barrel (Sterling Circle, 2003)
 Stone / Blossom (Sterling Circle, 2006)[2CD]
 Quiver (Yellowbird, 2012) – recorded in 2011
 Circuit Rider (Yellowbird, 2014) – recorded in 2013
 I Am a Man (Yellowbird, 2017) – recorded in 2016
 Rainbow Sign (Blue Note, 2020) – recorded in 2019

As sideman
With Bill Frisell
 1996: Quartet (Nonesuch)
 1999: The Sweetest Punch (Decca, 1999) with Elvis Costello
 2001: Blues Dream (Nonesuch)
 2007: Floratone (Blue Note) with Floratone
 2008: History, Mystery (Nonesuch)
 2012: Floratone II (Savoy Jazz) with Floratone

With Fred Hess
 2002: The Long and Short of It (Tapestry)
 2004: Crossed Paths (Tapestry)
 2006: How Bout' Now (Tapestry)
 2007: In the Grotto (Alison)
 2008: Single Moment (Alison)

With others
 1999: Ginger Baker and the DJQ2O, Coward of the County (Atlantic)
 2003: Joe Henry, Tiny Voices (ANTI-)
 2006: Wayne Horvitz, Way Out East (Songlines)
 2007: Jason Steele, Some Wonderful Moment (ears&eyes)
 2008: Rich Lamb, Music Along the Way (Rich Lamb)
 2009: Ben Goldberg, Go Home (BAG Production)
 2009: Hashem Assadullahi, Strange Neighbor (8Bells)
 2013: Aakash Mittal, Ocean (self)
 2012: Hashem Assadullahi, Pieces (OA2)
 2015: Whirlpool, Dancing on the Inside (ears&eyes)
 2017: Jason Moran, BANGS (Yes Records)
 2017: Matt Wilson, Honey & Salt (Palmetto)
 2018: Joshua Redman, Still Dreaming (Nonesuch)
 2022: Charles Rumback Seven Bridges

References

External links
 Ron Miles: Singing Through The Horn. NPR March 19, 2009
 Cornet Player Ron Miles Embraces His Pop Influences On 'Rainbow Sign'. WYPR November 4, 2020
 
 

1963 births
2022 deaths
20th-century African-American musicians
21st-century African-American musicians
20th-century American male musicians
21st-century American male musicians
20th-century trumpeters
21st-century trumpeters
Musicians from Indianapolis
Musicians from Denver
University of Denver alumni
University of Colorado Boulder alumni
Manhattan School of Music alumni
American male trumpeters
American jazz cornetists
American male jazz composers
American jazz composers
African-American jazz composers
Rykodisc artists
Gramavision Records artists
Blue Note Records artists
Deaths from blood cancer
Deaths from cancer in Colorado